Lye Valley is a  biological Site of Special Scientific Interest in Headington, a suburb of Oxford in Oxfordshire. It is part of the  Lye Valley Local Nature Reserve, which is owned and managed by Oxford City Council.

The site contains a range of habitats including spring-fed lowland fen, dominated by rushes and sedges, a variety of ponds, and wet woodland with small representations of lowland calcareous grassland, wood pasture and parkland. Lye Valley has one of the best examples in the country of a calcareous valley fen, a nationally rare habitat. The plant and animal species of the Lye Valley fen are thought to have lived there since they colonised the spring areas after the retreat of the last ice age between eight and ten thousand years ago.

The site has been studied by botanists since the 17th century and attracted particular interest in the  Victorian era. Rare plants include grass-of-Parnassus and marsh helleborine orchid, which are on the Red List of Threatened Species compiled by the International Union for the Conservation of Nature (IUCN).

Bird species found in the valley include reed warbler, reed bunting, water rail  and snipe.

References

External links
 Friends of Lye Valley website
 Oxford Conservation volunteers: Lye Valley page

 

Sites of Special Scientific Interest in Oxfordshire
Local nature reserves in Oxfordshire